Amphimallon peropacum is a species of beetle in the Melolonthinae subfamily that is endemic to Portugal.

References

Beetles described in 1911
peropacum
Endemic arthropods of Portugal
Beetles of Europe